Janet Graham (1723–1805) was a Scottish poet, and a feature of 18th century Edinburgh society.

Biography
Graham was born at Shaw, near Lockerbie, Dumfriesshire, in 1723. She lived in Dumfries and later Edinburgh, where she became a favoured member of Edinburgh society. 

Graham is remembered for her only surviving published poem, The Wayward Wife, which was once popular and was reprinted a number of times in anthologies. The poem is a warning to a son about the demerits of matrimony. She died in Edinburgh in April 1805, aged 82.

References

Notes

External links
The Wayward Wife (p. 120) in David Herd's Ancient and Modern Scottish Songs, Heroic Ballads, Etc (1870)

1723 births
1805 deaths
18th-century Scottish writers
18th-century British poets
18th-century British women writers
Scottish women poets
People from Dumfries and Galloway